The Netherlands competed at the 1948 Summer Olympics in London, England. 149 competitors, 115 men and 34 women, took part in 74 events in 18 sports.

Medalists

Athletics

Men's competition
 Hans Houtzager
 Jan Kleyn
 Jan Lammers
 Jef Lataster
 Nico Lutkeveld
 Jan Meijer
 Frits de Ruijter
 Gabe Scholten
 Wim Slijkhuis
 Jan Zwaan
 Jo Zwaan

Women's competition
 Fanny Blankers-Koen
 Elly Dammers
 Grietje de Jongh
 Gerda van der Kade-Koudijs
 Neeltje Karelse
 Ans Koning  
 Ans Panhorst-Niesink
 Nel Roos-Lodder
 Xenia Stad-de Jong
 Jo Teunissen-Waalboer
 Netty Witziers-Timmer

Boxing

 Herman Corman
 Moos Linneman
 Hennie Quentemeijer
 Jan Remie
 Jan Schubart
 Frits Wijngaard

Canoeing

Cycling

Nine cyclists, all men, represented the Netherlands in 1948.

Individual road race
 Henk Faanhof
 Evert Grift
 Piet Peters
 Gerrit Voorting

Team road race
 Henk Faanhof
 Evert Grift
 Piet Peters
 Gerrit Voorting

Sprint
 Jan Hijzelendoorn

Time trial
 Theo Blankenauw

Tandem
 Klaas Buchly
 Tinus van Gelder

Team pursuit
 Theo Blankenauw
 Henk Faanhof
 Joop Harmans
 Gerrit Voorting

Diving

Equestrian

Fencing

Nine fencers, seven men and two women, represented the Netherlands in 1948.

Men's foil
 Henny ter Weer
 Johannes Zoet
 Eddy Kuijpers

Men's team foil
 Willem van den Berg, Henny ter Weer, Frans Mosman, Eddy Kuijpers

Men's épée
 Roelof Hordijk

Men's sabre
 Frans Mosman
 Willem van den Berg
 Eddy Kuijpers

Men's team sabre
 Henny ter Weer, Antoon Hoevers, Willem van den Berg, Frans Mosman, Eddy Kuijpers

Women's foil
 Mary Meyer-van der Sluis
 Anja Secrève

Football

Gymnastics

Hockey

Men's team competition

Group C

Semi-finals

Bronze medal match

Team roster
André BoerstraHenk BouwmanPiet BrombergHarry DerckxHan DrijverDick EsserRoepie KruizeJenne LanghoutDick LoggereTon RichterEddy TielWim van Heel

Rowing

The Netherlands had six male rowers participate in two out of seven rowing events in 1948.

 Men's double sculls
 Tom Neumeier
 Henk van der Meer

 Men's coxless four
 Hein van Suylekom
 Sietze Haarsma
 Han Dekker
 Han van den Berg

Sailing

Shooting

Four shooters represented the Netherlands in 1948.

25 metre pistol
 Paulus Kessels

50 metre rifle
 Jan Hendrik Brussaard
 Geurt Schoonman
 Christiaan Both

Swimming

Water polo

Men's team competition
Preliminary round (Group C)
 Defeated India (12-1)
 Defeated Chile (14-0)
Second round (Group C)
 Defeated Spain (5-2)
Semi final round (Group A)
 Drew with Belgium (3-3)
 Defeated Sweden (5-3)
Final round
 Drew with Hungary (4-4)
 Lost to Italy (2-4) →  Bronze medal
Team roster
 Cor Braasem
 Ruud van Feggelen
 Hennie Keetelaar
 Nijs Korevaar
 Joop Rohner
 Frits Ruimschotel
 Piet Salomons
 Frits Smol
 Hans Stam

Weightlifting

Wrestling

Art competitions

References

External links
  Dutch Olympic Committee

Nations at the 1948 Summer Olympics
1948
Olympics